Lyreidus is a genus of crabs in the family Raninidae, containing the following species:
Lyreidus brevifrons Sakai, 1937
Lyreidus stenops Wood-Mason, 1887
Lyreidus tridentatus de Haan, 1841

References

Crabs